Kathryn Elizabeth Douglas (born May 7, 1979) is an American former professional basketball player. Her primary position was shooting guard, her secondary was small forward. She was known league-wide as one of the most prominent two-way players for her long-range shooting and high scoring abilities on offense as well as her defensive abilities.

In the WNBA, she has been a multiple time WNBA All-Star and has been a selection to both the All-WNBA Team and WNBA All-Defensive First Team. She won WNBA Championship with the Indiana Fever in 2012.

College years
After attending Perry Meridian High School in Indianapolis, Douglas attended Purdue University and graduated in 2001 as a communications major. She helped lead Purdue to an NCAA Women's Division I Basketball Championship in 1999 and was a two-time Kodak All-America in 2000 and 2001, as well as being named to the 1999 and 2001 NCAA Women's Final Four All-Tournament Team. She shared Big Ten Conference Player of the Year honors in 2000 with Helen Darling, and in 2001 was the unanimous Big Ten Player of the Year and winner of the Silver Basketball from the Chicago Tribune. Douglas also received the 2001 Big Ten Conference Suzy Favor Award, which is given to the conference's female athlete of the year across all sports. Douglas played at Purdue for head coach Carolyn Peck.

Purdue statistics
Source

USA Basketball

Douglas played on the team presenting the US at the 1999 World University Games held in Palma de Mallorca, Spain. The team had a 4–2 record and earned the silver medal. Douglas was the leading scorer on the USA team with 17.6 points per game.

WNBA career
Douglas was selected the 10th overall pick by the Orlando Miracle in the 2001 WNBA draft.  She remained with the franchise even when the Miracle relocated to Uncasville, Connecticut, and was renamed the Connecticut Sun prior to the 2003 season. Before becoming an all-star in the league, Douglas earned some WNBA Finals experience early in her career while the Connecticut Sun were championship contenders in both the 2004 and 2005 seasons. The Sun made it to the finals in both seasons but would lose both times to the Seattle Storm and Sacramento Monarchs respectively. Following the 2005 WNBA season, Douglas had a breakout year in 2006, averaging 16.4 ppg and being voted as a WNBA all-star for the first time. Douglas was named to the WNBA All-Defensive First Team and received the Most Valuable Player award in the 2006 WNBA All-Star Game.

In 2007, Douglas ranked 5th in the league in steals (65), 7th in scoring (577), and 12th in assists (125). Douglas was again selected for the WNBA All-Defensive First Team.

On February 19, 2008, the Connecticut Sun traded Douglas to her hometown team, the Indiana Fever for Tamika Whitmore and the Fever's first round pick in the 2008 WNBA Draft, she would play alongside superstar small forward Tamika Catchings. She would have a solid season in her first year with the team by averaging 15.6 ppg, but unexpectedly struggled in the playoffs, averaging only 7.3 ppg. The Fever had gotten eliminated in the first round 2-1 by the Detroit Shock. In the 2009 season, Douglas would have the best season of her career, she had back-to-back 30+ point games, becoming the first player in franchise history to do so. She also scored a career high and franchise record, 34 points in a regular season game win against the Washington Mystics and averaged a career-high 17.6 ppg. Douglas would be voted into the 2009 WNBA All-Star Game. The Fever would make it to the finals that year, but lost 3–2 to the Phoenix Mercury. A few seasons later, Douglas would win her first WNBA Championship with the Indiana Fever in 2012 as they had beat the Minnesota Lynx 3–1. It was her fourth career WNBA Finals appearance, although she was sidelined for the series after sustaining an ankle injury during the Eastern Conference Finals. With a few seconds left in the final game of the series at home and the Fever with a comfortable lead, Douglas was subbed in while the crowd was giving a standing ovation. En route to her first championship, Douglas had another great year during the 2012 season, averaging 16.5 ppg. In a regular season game win against the Atlanta Dream, Douglas scored 29 points along with a franchise-record 7 three-pointers.

Douglas wouldn't see much playing time in the 2013 season, missing a huge bulk of the season due to a lower back injury and playing a total of only 4 games. The injury would also cause her to miss the playoffs. This season would be Douglas's last season with the Fever as she became an unrestricted free agent.

On March 24, 2014, Douglas returned to the Connecticut Sun in free agency, signing a 2-year deal with a third-year option. She had another productive season averaging 13.1 ppg and was voted into the WNBA all-star game for the fifth time in her career. Despite her stats, the Sun finished last place in the Eastern Conference.

On May 1, 2015, Douglas announced her retirement after 14 seasons in the WNBA.

Among the WNBA all-time leaders, Douglas ranks 16th in regular season scoring, 6th in regular season 3-pointers made, 5th in regular season steals, 10th in playoff scoring, 4th in playoff 3-pointers made and 4th in playoff steals.

WNBA career statistics

Regular season

|-
| style="text-align:left;"| 2001
| style="text-align:left;"| Orlando
| 22 || 0 || 20.0 || .362 || .316 || .723 || 2.3 || 1.8 || 1.7 || 0.3 || 2.00 || 7.0
|-
| style="text-align:left;"| 2002
| style="text-align:left;"| Orlando
| 32 || 30 || 25.9 || .449 || .367 || .866 || 4.2 || 1.7 || 1.5 || 0.4 || 1.31 || 8.5
|-
| style="text-align:left;"| 2003
| style="text-align:left;"| Connecticut
| 28 || 27 || 30.1 || .438 || .382 || .721 || 3.8 || 2.0 || 1.1 || 0.4 || 1.00 || 12.0
|-
| style="text-align:left;"| 2004
| style="text-align:left;"| Connecticut
| 34 || 34 || 32.9 || .389 || .346 || .792 || 3.9 || 2.6 || 1.5 || 0.4 || 1.53 || 10.7
|-
| style="text-align:left;"| 2005
| style="text-align:left;"| Connecticut
| 32 || 32 || 31.2 || .413 || .282 || .774 || 4.1 || 2.9 || 1.5 || 0.1 || 1.69 || 11.0
|-
| style="text-align:left;"| 2006
| style="text-align:left;"| Connecticut
| 32 || 32 || 31.3 || .443 || .422 || .839 || 3.8 || 2.5 || 1.9 || 0.1 || 2.28 || 16.4
|-
| style="text-align:left;"| 2007
| style="text-align:left;"| Connecticut
| 34 || 34 || 33.3 || .428 || .338 || .779 || 4.6 || 3.7 || 1.9 || 0.3 || 2.79 || 17.0
|-
| style="text-align:left;"| 2008
| style="text-align:left;"| Indiana
| 33 || 33 || 34.4 || .371 || .324 || .799 || 4.1 || 3.2 || 1.6 || 0.3 || 3.03 || 15.6
|-
| style="text-align:left;"| 2009
| style="text-align:left;"| Indiana
| 31 || 31 || 32.4 || .410 || .349 || .861 || 3.9 || 2.7 || 1.8 || 0.2 || 2.42 || 17.6
|-
| style="text-align:left;"| 2010
| style="text-align:left;"| Indiana
| 34 || 34 || 29.8 || .449 || .391 || .831 || 3.4 || 3.3 || 1.4 || 0.4 || 1.97 || 13.7
|-
| style="text-align:left;"| 2011
| style="text-align:left;"| Indiana
| 32 || 32 || 29.4 || .465 || .440 || .671 || 3.9 || 2.8 || 1.3 || 0.3 || 2.03 || 13.9
|-
|style="text-align:left;background:#afe6ba;"| 2012†
| style="text-align:left;"| Indiana
| 32 || 32 || 30.9 || .413 || .423 || .844 || 3.8 || 2.2 || 1.5 || 0.3 || 1.66 || 16.5
|-
| style="text-align:left;"| 2013
| style="text-align:left;"| Indiana
| 4 || 4 || 35.8 || .389 || .259 || 1.000 || 2.8 || 1.5 || 1.8 || 0.5 || 2.75 || 15.0
|-
| style="text-align:left;"| 2014
| style="text-align:left;"| Connecticut
| 32 || 32 || 32.5 || .358 || .356 || .848 || 3.3 || 2.2 || 0.9 || 0.4 || 2.22 || 13.1
|-
| style="text-align:left;"| Career
| style="text-align:left;"| 14 years, 3 teams
| 412 || 387 || 30.7 || .415 || .367 || .805 || 3.8 || 2.6 || 1.5 || 0.3 || 2.05 || 13.5

Postseason

|-
| style="text-align:left;"| 2003
| style="text-align:left;"| Connecticut
| 4 || 4 || 31.5 || .333 || .250 || .857 || 2.5 || 3.0 || 0.8 || 0.2 || 0.25 || 7.3
|-
| style="text-align:left;"| 2004
| style="text-align:left;"| Connecticut
| 8 || 8 || 33.5 || .348 || .297 || .926 || 4.0 || 2.8 || 1.2 || 0.0 || 2.00 || 10.3
|-
| style="text-align:left;"| 2005
| style="text-align:left;"| Connecticut
| 8 || 8 || 34.8 || .463 || .395 || .655 || 4.6 || 2.3 || 1.4 || 0.1 || 1.00 || 12.0
|-
| style="text-align:left;"| 2006
| style="text-align:left;"| Connecticut
| 4 || 4 || 31.3 || .400 || .296 || .800 || 3.8 || 2.5 || 1.0 || 0.2 || 2.75 || 12.0
|-
| style="text-align:left;"| 2007
| style="text-align:left;"| Connecticut
| 3 || 3 || 38.0 || .346 || .286 || .889 || 5.3 || 3.3 || style="background:#D3D3D3"|3.3° || 0.0 || 5.00 || 17.3
|-
| style="text-align:left;"| 2008
| style="text-align:left;"| Indiana
| 3 || 3 || 31.0 || .318 || .125 || .700 || 2.3 || 2.3 || 1.3 || 0.7 || 3.33 || 7.3
|-
| style="text-align:left;"| 2009
| style="text-align:left;"| Indiana
| 10 || 10 || 36.1 || .362 || .310 || .814 || 3.5 || 4.0 || 1.4 || 0.6 || 1.90 || 15.5
|-
| style="text-align:left;"| 2010
| style="text-align:left;"| Indiana
| 3 || 3 || 31.7 || .458 || .333 || .833 || 3.0 || 3.3 || 1.3 || 0.3 || 1.00 || 11.7
|-
| style="text-align:left;"| 2011
| style="text-align:left;"| Indiana
| 6 || 6 || 33.5 || .426 || .436 || .840 || 5.0 || 2.7 || 0.8 || 0.2 || 2.17 || 19.7
|-
|style="text-align:left;background:#afe6ba;"| 2012†
| style="text-align:left;"| Indiana
| 7 || 6 || 24.6 || .455 || .355 || .750 || 2.0 ||1.3 || 1.0 || 0.0 || 1.57 || 13.3
|-
| style="text-align:left;"| Career
| style="text-align:left;"| 10 years, 2 teams
| 56 || 55 || 32.7 || .395 || .331 || .803 || 3.7 || 2.8 || 1.3 || 0.2 || 1.91 || 13.0

Overseas career
From her second year to her thirteenth year in the WNBA, Douglas played overseas every off-season. Douglas went to Greece to play for Ano Liosia Basketball in the 2002-03 off-season. Douglas played in Greece once again for S.U. Glyfada Esperides Kyklos the following off-season. From 2004 to 2007, Douglas played three off-seasons in Lithuania for Lietuvos telekomas / TEO Vilnius. In the 2007-08 off-season, Douglas played for Ros Casares Valencia of the Spanish League. In the 2008-09 off-season, Douglas played for CSKA Moscow before the team folded the same year. Douglas played for Galatasaray of the Turkish League during the 2009-10 off-season with then Indiana Fever teammate Tamika Catchings. Douglas returned to Spain to play once again for Ros Casares Valencia in the 2010-11 off-season. In the 2011-12 off-season, Douglas played for Nadezhda Orenburg in the Russian League and finished off her overseas career playing in Poland for WBC Wisła Kraków in the 2012-13 off-season.

Personal life
Douglas lost both her parents to cancer; her father in 1997 and her mother less than three years later in 2000.  She was awarded the first-ever Jim V Foundation Comeback of the Year Award in 2001 for her perseverance after a string of tragic, personal losses.

One week after the 2005 WNBA Finals loss to the Sacramento Monarchs, Douglas married Vasilis Giapalakis in Athens, Greece. Giapalakis is a sports agent who represents male and female basketball players. Douglas, who played for a Lithuanian basketball team in the WNBA offseason, met Giapalakis when she was playing for a Greek club. The couple divorced a few years later.

In July 2015, just a couple months after her retirement, Douglas married Fred Poe, who is an owner of a fence company named K & K Fence Co. Douglas and her husband have a second in home in Fort Myers, Florida.

Business ventures
In 2017, Douglas opened an Orangetheory Fitness franchise fitness center in Greenwood, Indiana.

Awards and achievements
 2005 WNBA All-Defensive First Team
 2006 All-WNBA First Team, WNBA All-Defensive First Team, WNBA All-Star Selection (MVP)
 2007 All-WNBA Second Team, WNBA All-Defensive First Team, WNBA All-Star Selection
 2009 All-WNBA Second Team, WNBA All-Star Selection
 2010 All-WNBA Second Team, WNBA All-Defensive Second Team
 2011 WNBA All-Defensive Second Team, WNBA All-Star Selection
 Number 23 retired by the Connecticut Sun.

References

External links

Purdue bio
Purdue Senior Honored at ESPN The Magazine's College Basketball Awards
WNBA chat transcript

Fever Acquires Douglas for Whitmore

1979 births
Living people
All-American college women's basketball players
American expatriate basketball people in Lithuania
American expatriate basketball people in Russia
American expatriate basketball people in Spain
American expatriate basketball people in Turkey
American women's basketball players
Basketball players from Indianapolis
Connecticut Sun players
Galatasaray S.K. (women's basketball) players
Indiana Fever players
Orlando Miracle players
Parade High School All-Americans (girls' basketball)
Purdue Boilermakers women's basketball players
Shooting guards
Small forwards
Universiade medalists in basketball
Universiade silver medalists for the United States
Women's National Basketball Association All-Stars
Medalists at the 1999 Summer Universiade
Big Ten Athlete of the Year winners
United States women's national basketball team players